Zhang Qun or Chang Ch'ün (May 9, 1889 – December 14, 1990) also known as Zhang Yuejun (張岳軍), was premier of the Republic of China and a prominent member of the Kuomintang. He served as secretary general to the President of the Republic from 1954 to 1972 and senior advisor to Presidents Chiang Kai-shek, Yen Chia-kan, Chiang Ching-kuo, and Lee Teng-hui. Under the influence of his wife, Ma Yu-ying, he became a Christian in the 1930s.

Education and early career
Born in the Huayang County (now part of Shuangliu County), Sichuan province, Chang was admitted in 1906 to the Baoding Military Academy, just southwest of Beijing. The next year, he was selected to go to Japan to study at the Tokyo Shimbu Gakko, a preparatory military school, where he specialized in artillery. Together with his classmate, Chiang Kai-shek, he joined the T'ung-meng-hui the same year. After completing their preparatory studies, they both served in the Takada regiment of the Imperial Japanese Army’s 13th Field Artillery Brigade, stationed in Niigata Prefecture before returning to China to serve under Sun Yat-sen in the Xinhai Revolution which would overthrow the Qing monarchy in 1911. During this period, a lifelong friendship between the two men and Huang Fu was formed and the three became sworn, or blood, brothers. Chang married Ma Yu-ying (馬育英) in 1913; because their first child was born in 1917, he later joked to have practiced family planning long before it became popular.

When Yuan Shikai attempted to restore the monarchy, Chang fled to Japan, finished his military training at the Imperial Japanese Army Academy in 1915, and then went to the Netherlands East Indies, where he taught in an overseas Chinese school. Returning to China to participate in Yuan's overthrow in the National Protection War, he served as adjutant-general to Cen Chunxuan, president of the southern provinces, which repudiated Yuan's regime. With the restoration of the Republic, Chang held several posts. Becoming a major general of the National Revolutionary Army at age 28, he later became a member of the Kuomintang's Central Executive Committee, mayor of Shanghai and president of Tongji University, governor of Hubei province and foreign minister. In the KMT, he led the Political Science Clique (政學系), which included military men such as Huang Fu and Xiong Shihui (熊式輝), intellectuals, such as Yang Yongtai (楊永泰) and Wang Ch'ung-hui, and bankers and industrialists, including Wu Dingchang (吳鼎昌) and Chang Kia-ngau.  During World War II, he served as secretary general of the National Security Council and governor of Sichuan province.

Post-war career

In 1946, Chang, representing the national government, was a member of the Committee of Three (also known as the Marshall Mission) along with General George C. Marshall, then head of the U.S. Joint Chiefs of Staff, and Chinese Communist Party representative Zhou Enlai, which had been established in Nanjing in January, 1946 to effect a Kuomintang-Chinese Communist Party truce and head off civil war. The Marshall Mission helped to bring about a temporary cease-fire and but its plans for a political-military settlement did not succeed.

In 1947, Chang headed the first coalition government as president of the Executive Yuan, a position also known as premier of the Republic of China. His platform was to prepare China for constitutional government, land reform and price control.  Despite his long ties with Chiang Kai-shek, he could not bring about the political reforms he favored. After the transfer of the capital from Nanjing to Taipei, he became chief of staff and secretary general to the president in 1954. Among his duties were planning the government's foreign policy and representing the president in Japan, Africa and Europe, including the Second Vatican Council in 1965. In 1972, he played a large role in the difficult negotiations regarding Japan's switch of diplomatic recognition to the People's Republic of China. His last official position was chairman of the Presidium of the Kuomintang's Central Advisory Committee.

Personal life
A member of the board of the National Palace Museum, Chang was a renowned calligrapher, keen art collector, friend of great artists such as Chang Dai-chien, Huang Jun-bi and Lan Yin-ting, and recipient of honorary doctorates from several universities, including the University of Illinois, Seoul National University, St. John's University (New York), Sungkyunkwan University and Soochow University (Taiwan). From 20 January 1990, when former Japanese Prime Minister Prince Naruhiko Higashikuni died until his own death, Chang was the world's oldest living former head of government.

Chang's wife, Ma Yu-ying (馬育英; pinyin: Ma Yuying), was a devout Christian and died in 1974. His daughter, Yalan Chang Lew (劉張亞蘭; pinyin: Liu Zhang Yalan), died on July 14, 2014 at age 97 in Seattle, USA; she was the widow of Ambassador Yu-tang Daniel Lew (劉毓棠; pinyin: Liu Yutang), who had died in 2005 at age 92 in Taipei. His son, Dr. Philip Chi-cheng Chang (張繼正; pinyin: Zhang Jizheng), who died on October 24, 2015 at age 96 in Taipei, was former  communications minister 1969-72, chairman of the Council for Economic Planning and Development 1973-76, finance minister 1978-81 and governor of the Central Bank of China 1984-89. His second son, Rev. Dr. Theodore Chi-chong Chang (張繼忠; pinyin: Zhang Jizhong), who died on October 26, 2020 at age 92 in California, was vice president of the Truth Theological Seminary and pastor emeritus of the Mandarin Baptist Church of Pasadena, California.

Awards 

  Order of National Glory
  Order of Blue Sky and White Sun
  Order of Chiang Chung-Cheng
  Order of the Brilliant Star, Special Class with Grand Cordon
  Order of the Three Stars, 1st Class (January 19, 1937)

References

External links 

Article on the Chang residence in Shanghai by Michelle Qiao, Shanghai Daily Home
Photo of Premier Chang arriving at the National Assembly's first meeting in 1948
Chang Chun examining Yangtze River, the 65-foot-long painting by Zhang Daqian, commissioned for his 80th birthday
Photographic article on the Chang Residence in Shihlin, designed by Wang Da-hong. On April 7, 2014, the residence was declared a cultural heritage site by the Taipei City Department of Cultural Affairs. 
August 4, 2017 TVBS review of future use of the Chang Residence in Shihlin
Inclusion of the Chang Residence in Soochow University's History Map

Internet videos 
Governor Chang takes salute at a parade of Central Military Academy cadets, marking the 31st anniversary of the Chinese Revolution in 1942
General George Marshall watches National Security Council Secretary General Chang Chun and Communist representative Zhou Enlai sign the truce in 1946. (View from 6:56)
行政院長張群蒞台 Premier Chang arrives in Taipei in October, 1947
台灣省慶祝第二屆光復節大會 Premier Chang presides over the celebrations of Taiwan's Retrocession Day, October 25, 1947
張群特使訪日專輯 Special Envoy Chang Chun visits Japan, where he met with the Emperor, Prime Minister Nobusuke Kishi and others in 1957
日本前首相吉田茂訪華 Secretary General Chang receives former Japanese Prime Minister Shigeru Yoshida in 1964
長江萬里圖 The 65-foot-long painting, Yangtze River by Chang Dai-chien, commissioned for Chang Chun's 80th birthday, on display at the National Museum of History in Taipei in 1967
行政院新舊任院長交接典禮 Secretary General Chang presides over the transfer of the premiership in 1972
張學良 Chang Hsueh-liang's 90th birthday celebration, hosted by 101-year-old Chang Chun on June 1, 1990 (View especially from 0:29-1:04 where Chang Chun remembers their friendship of 60 years)

1889 births
1990 deaths
Chinese centenarians
Men centenarians
Tongmenghui members
People of the 1911 Revolution
Mayors of Shanghai
Baoding Military Academy cadets
Chinese police officers
Senior Advisors to President Chiang Kai-shek
Senior Advisors to President Chiang Ching-kuo
Senior Advisors to President Lee Teng-hui
Premiers of the Republic of China
Foreign Ministers of the Republic of China
Politicians from Chengdu
Republic of China politicians from Sichuan
Kuomintang politicians in Taiwan
Recipients of the Order of Brilliant Star
Recipients of the Order of Chiang Chung-Cheng
Sichuanese Protestants
Taiwanese Protestants
Taiwanese people from Sichuan